Entephria flavicinctata, the yellow-ringed carpet, is a moth of the family Geometridae. The species was first described by Jacob Hübner in 1813. It is found in the mountainous areas of the Palearctic realm The distribution is disjunct extending across the Pyrenees, the Alps, some lower mountains (Vosges, Iceland, British Isles) and then from Norway across the Arctic to northern Russia.

The wingspan is 27–39 mm. The ground colour is pale grey. The basal, central and outer marginal cross lines are suffused with yellow. The hindwings are pale white.See also Prout.  The larva is pinkish brown, the body with powerful, protruding brushes. On the dorsum it has pink, triangular spots that are edged with dark brown.It resembles that of Entephria caesiata but is rather more stumpy, tapering
anteriorly, and the dorsal triangles are smaller. 

Adults are on wing from June to August and sometimes also in May.

The larvae feed on Saxifraga and Sedum species. The species probably overwinters in the larval stage.

Subspecies
Entephria flavicinctata flavicinctata (Europe)
Entephria flavicinctata corsaria Schawerda, 1928
Entephria flavicinctata elbrusensis Tikhonov, 1994 (northern Caucasus, Dagestan)
Entephria flavicinctata ruficinctata Guenee, 1858
Entephria flavicinctata septentrionalis Warnecke, 1934 (Fennoscandia)
Entephria flavicinctata veletaria Wehrli, 1926

References

External links

Yellow-ringed Carpet at UKMoths
Fauna Europaea
Lepiforum e.V.

Larentiini
Moths of Europe
Moths of Iceland
Insects of the Arctic
Taxa named by Jacob Hübner